Nabil Elouahabi (born 6 February 1975), often credited as Nabil Elouhabi, is a English actor, known for his role  as Tariq Larousi in EastEnders from 2003 to 2005, as Rashid "Gary" Mahmoon in "Strangers on the Shore" (the 2002 Christmas Special of Only Fools and Horses) and as Mr. Mustapha in the Netflix series Top Boy in 2011 and 2013.

Career
Nabil made his acting debut in an episode of the BBC medical drama series Casualty in 1998. He went on to have roles in several television series such as Attachments, Only Fools and Horses and In This World.
He also appeared in films such as Ali G Indahouse (2002) and The Sum of All Fears (2002). In 2003 he won the role of Tariq Larousi in the BBC soap opera EastEnders. In 2005 he was axed from the soap after his character, along with his on-screen family, the Ferreiras, proved to be unpopular with audiences.

Since leaving EastEnders he has appeared in Holby City and has played real-life terrorist Ramzi Yousef in the television mini-series The Path to 9/11. In 2008 he played Meesh, a Kuwaiti translator, in HBO's Generation Kill.

Most recently Nabil played Dean Andrews on Breeders, and appeared in the three-part Jimmy McGovern drama series Time on BBC 1.On January 16, 2022, Elouahabi appeared in Vera in the episode "As the Crow Flies" in the role of Mo Hassan.

Filmography

Film

Television

Video games

External links

1975 births
English people of Moroccan descent
British male film actors
British male soap opera actors
Living people
Moroccan male film actors
Moroccan male television actors
20th-century Moroccan male actors
21st-century Moroccan male actors